Erkin Koray Tutkusu is the fourth full-length album by Turkish rock star Erkin Koray and was released a year after "Erkin Koray 2", his most ethnic record. "Erkin Koray Tutkusu" saw his return to psychedelic rock. 
This album was remastered in 2006 and reissued on Underground Masters.

Track listing
"Allah Aşkina"  – 2:35
"Mağarada Düğün"  – 2:54
"Sandalci"  – 2:50
"My Delight"  – 3:19
"Bir Olasilik"  – 2:03
"Cümbür Cemaat"  – 4:55
"Sanma"  – 3:37
"Suskunluğun Ötesi"  – 5:05
"Blond Men"  – 3:45
"Geliyor"  – 1:46
"Yalniz Sen Varsin"  – 5:08

Erkin Koray albums
1977 albums